Drifting Along is a 1946 American Western film directed by Derwin Abrahams and starring Johnny Mack Brown, Lynne Carver and Raymond Hatton.

Cast
 Johnny Mack Brown as Steve Garner 
 Lynne Carver as Pat McBride 
 Raymond Hatton as Pawnee Jones 
 Douglas Fowley as Jack Dailey 
 Smith Ballew as Band Singer Smith 
 Milburn Morante as Zeke the Cook 
 Thornton Edwards as Cowhand Pedro 
 Steve Clark as Lou Woods 
 Marshall Reed as Henchman Slade Matthews 
 Jack Rockwell as Sheriff Devers 
 Lynton Brent as Henchman Joe 
 Terry Frost as Henchman Gus 
 Leonard St. Lee as Henchman Red 
 Ted Mapes as Henchman Ted 
 Curt Barrett as Guitar Player 
 Curt Barrett and the Trailsmen as Musicians

References

Bibliography
 Bernard A. Drew. Motion Picture Series and Sequels: A Reference Guide. Routledge, 2013.

External links

1946 films
1946 Western (genre) films
American Western (genre) films
Monogram Pictures films
Films directed by Derwin Abrahams
1940s English-language films
1940s American films